Somersham railway station was a station in Somersham, Cambridgeshire on the Great Eastern Railway between March and St Ives. There was also a branch line that ran north-west from the station to Ramsey. It opened in 1848, but was closed on 6 March 1967.

The station was demolished and rebuilt at the private Fawley Railway Museum.

References

External links
 Somersham station on navigable 1946 O. S. map

Former Great Northern and Great Eastern Joint Railway stations
Disused railway stations in Cambridgeshire
Railway stations in Great Britain opened in 1848
Railway stations in Great Britain closed in 1967
Beeching closures in England